U46619 is a stable synthetic analog of the endoperoxide prostaglandin PGH2 first prepared in 1975, and acts as a thromboxane A2 (TP) receptor agonist.  It potently stimulates TP receptor-mediated, but not other prostaglandin receptor-mediated responses in various in vitro preparations and exhibits many properties similar to thromboxane A2, including shape change and aggregation of platelets  and smooth muscle contraction. U46619 is a vasoconstrictor that mimics the hydroosmotic effect of vasopressin.

References

Prostaglandins